Holčovice is a municipality and village in Bruntál District in the Moravian-Silesian Region of the Czech Republic. It has about 700 inhabitants.

Administrative parts
Villages of Dlouhá Ves, Hejnov, Jelení, Komora and Spálené are administrative parts of Holčovice.

History
The first written mention of Holčovice is from 1377.

References

Villages in Bruntál District